is a Japanese tokusatsu superhero television series produced as part of the Kamen Rider series. The ninth show in the franchise, it is a joint collaboration between Ishimori Productions and Toei Company, and aired on the Mainichi Broadcasting System and the Tokyo Broadcasting System from October 23, 1988, to September 24, 1989. The series is a direct sequel to Kamen Rider Black and the first to feature a team-up with the past Riders since the 1984 TV special Birth of the 10th! Kamen Riders All Together!!. For distribution purposes, Toei refers to this television series as Black Kamen Rider RX.

This was also the last instalment of the Kamen Rider series to be produced in the Shōwa era and the first to be produced in the Heisei one — Episode 11 was delayed by one week following Emperor Hirohito's death.

The series was adapted by Saban in North America as Masked Rider. The show featured a heavily altered story and all-new characters, in an attempt to fit the series in as a spin-off of Power Rangers, but ultimately failed to catch an audience.

Story

After the downfall of Gorgom, Kotaro Minami has gotten a job as a helicopter pilot in a business owned by the Sahara family, who have also given him a new home. Kotaro is later captured by the Crisis Empire and offered a place in their group. When Kotaro refuses, his King Stone is shattered, and he is thrown into space where the sun's radiation mutates his King Stone and he turns into Kamen Rider Black RX. With his new powers, he wages a one-man war against the Crisis Empire and thwarts their plans to take over Earth.

Episodes
  (Original Airdate: October 23, 1988)
  (Original Airdate: October 30, 1988)
  (Original Airdate: November 6, 1988)
  (Original Airdate: November 13, 1988)
  (Original Airdate: November 20, 1988)
  (Original Airdate: November 27, 1988)
  (Original Airdate: December 4, 1988)
  (Original Airdate: December 11, 1988)
  (Original Airdate: December 18, 1988)
  (Original Airdate: December 25, 1988)
  (Original Airdate: January 15, 1989)
  (Original Airdate: January 22, 1989)
  (Original Airdate: January 29, 1989)
  (Original Airdate: February 5, 1989)
  (Original Airdate: February 12, 1989)
  (Original Airdate: February 19, 1989)
  (Original Airdate: February 26, 1989)
  (Original Airdate: March 5, 1989)
  (Original Airdate: March 12, 1989)
  (Original Airdate: March 19, 1989)
  (Original Airdate: March 26, 1989)
  (Original Airdate: April 2, 1989)
  (Original Airdate: April 9, 1989)
  (Original Airdate: April 16, 1989)
  (Original Airdate: April 23, 1989)
  (Original Airdate: April 30, 1989)
  (Original Airdate: May 7, 1989)
  (Original Airdate: May 14, 1989)
  (Original Airdate: May 21, 1989)
  (Original Airdate: May 28, 1989)
  (Original Airdate: June 4, 1989)
  (Original Airdate: June 11, 1989)
  (Original Airdate: June 18, 1989)
  (Original Airdate: June 25, 1989)
  (Original Airdate: July 2, 1989)
  (Original Airdate: July 9, 1989)
  (Original Airdate: July 16, 1989)
  (Original Airdate: July 23, 1989)
  (Original Airdate: July 30, 1989)
  (Original Airdate: August 6, 1989)
  (Original Airdate: August 13, 1989)
  (Original Airdate: August 20, 1989)
  (Original Airdate: August 27, 1989)
  (Original Airdate: September 3, 1989)
  (Original Airdate: September 10, 1989)
  (Original Airdate: September 17, 1989)
  (Original Airdate: September 24, 1989)

TV special
1988:  - It covers all the heroes, from Kamen Rider 1 until ZX and introduces Kamen Rider Black RX.

3D Film
 is a short 3D film originally screened in the Coal History Village in Yubari between April 29 throughout October 31, 1989. The film involves a team-up between Kotaro Minami's four Kamen Rider alter-egos (Black, RX, Robo Rider and Bio Rider) to fight against the Crisis Empire. Tetsuo Kurata plays Kotaro Minami and voices all four of his Kamen Rider alter-egos. General Jark, the four commanders of Crisis, and three high priests of Gorgom also appear in the movie, all played by their original actors with the exception of Bosgan (who is unvoiced) and Darom (who is voiced by Eisuke Yoda). The movie was written by Yoshio Urasawa and directed by series director Yoshiaki Kobayashi.

In the film, the Crisis Empire devises a plan to defeat Kotaro by reverting him back to his old form of Kamen Rider Black and sending out several revived monsters after him. However, Kamen Rider Black is assisted by another Black RX, who used a time warp to help his past self. The two are joined by Black RX's alternate forms of Robo Rider and Bio Rider, and the four Riders combine their powers to defeat the revived monsters.

The film is included as a bonus on the Region 2 DVD release of Kamen Rider Black RX Vol. 2. The DVD versions lack the original 3D effects of the theatrical release. A bonus Blu-ray 3D disc containing the movie is included in the "Kamen Rider: The Movie Blu-ray Box 1972-1988" set.

After 0
The S.I.C. Hero Saga story for Black RX ran in Monthly Hobby Japan in the December 2002 through March 2003 issues. Titled , it tells the story of what happened after the finale of Black RX.

Chapter titles

Cast
 Tetsuo Kurata as 
 Makoto Sumikawa as 
 Makoto Akatsuka as 
 Eri Tsuruma as 
 Rikiya Koyama as  
 Megumi Ueno as 
 Joe Onodera as 
 Go Inoue as 
 Shoko Imura as 
 Maho Maruyama as Princess Garonia (Teenager Hitomi)
 Minoru Sawatari as 
 Goro Naya as 
 Seizō Katō (1-44) and Hidekatsu Shibata (45 & 46) as  
 Atsuko Takahata as 
 Shōzō Iizuka as 
 Toshimichi Takahashi as 
 Kazunori Arai as 
 Atsuo Mori as 
 Tetsuya Matsui as 
 Masaki Terasoma as 
 Teiji Ōmiya as 
 Issei Masamune as Narrator

Songs
Opening theme

Lyrics: Kang Jin-hwa
Composition & Arrangement: Eiji Kawamura
Artist: Takayuki Miyauchi
Ending theme

Lyrics: Kang Jin-hwa
Composition: Tetsuji Hayashi
Arrangement: Eiji Kawamura
Artist: Takayuki Miyauchi

References

External links 
 Ishimori@Style - Shotaro Ishinomori with Ishimori Productions Official Website
 Kamen Rider Black RX Song's Collection at Play Store
 Black RX Song's Collection at Play Store

Black RX
1988 Japanese television series debuts
1989 Japanese television series endings
1980s Japanese television series
Sequel television series
Mainichi Broadcasting System original programming